Matara railway station is a station in Matara, Sri Lanka.  It is owned and operated by Sri Lanka Railways.  Matara railway station opened on 17 December 1895 as the terminus of the Coastal Line.

Location
Matara station is located in the centre of the city, north of the Nilwala River.

Layout
Matara railway station is designed as  through station, despite it being the coastal line's current terminus.

Services

Matara station is served by the Ruhunu Kumari, Galu Kumari, Rajarata Rejini and Sagarika trains.  Many other services also operate at Matara.  Local trains within the Southern Province connect Matara with Galle, calling at local stations along the route.

Inter-city trains

Local trains

Continuity

References

Railway stations in Matara, Sri Lanka
Railway stations on the Coastal Line
Railway stations opened in 1895